The My Twisted Mind Tour was the second concert tour by American recording artist, K. Michelle. The tour began in February 2015 and continued throughout the year. The tour was in support of her second album, Anybody Wanna Buy a Heart?, which achieved large success in the United States, peaking at number six on the Billboard 200 and selling 120,000 copies to date.

Tour dates

References

2015 concert tours
K. Michelle